Amed nesîm-i subh-dem is a  Persian traditional music and Ottoman classical music tune. Its music was composed  by Abd al-Qadir Maraghi. The song is from the Ottoman era and is written entirely in the Persian language.

Lyrics

See also
Xekina Mia Psaropoula
Byzantine music

References

Ottoman music
Persian music
Year of song unknown
Songwriter unknown